Zinnemann is a surname. Notable people with the surname include:

 Fred Zinnemann (1907–1997), Jewish Austrian-American film director
 Tim Zinnemann (born 1940), American film director, producer, and photographer

See also
 Zingerman's

German-language surnames
Jewish surnames